Thomas & Friends is a children's television series about the engines and other characters working on the railways of the Island of Sodor, and is based on The Railway Series books written by the Reverend W. Awdry.

This article lists and details episodes from the seventh season of this series, which was first broadcast between 6 October and 10 November 2003. This season was narrated by Michael Angelis for UK audiences, while Michael Brandon narrated the episodes for American audiences. 

In the United States, this season first aired in 2004 on PBS Kids alongside season 8. Michael Angelis later re-narrated four episodes for the United States audiences.

Episodes

Characters

Introduced
 Emily ("Emily's New Coaches")
 Fergus ("Bill, Ben and Fergus")
 Arthur ("The Spotless Record")
 Murdoch ("Peace and Quiet")
 Spencer ("Gordon and Spencer")
 Sodor Brass Band ("Edward's Brass Band")
 Lord Callan ("Bad Day at Castle Loch")
 The Duke and Duchess of Boxford ("Gordon and Spencer") (do not speak)

Recurring cast

 Thomas
 Edward
 Henry
 Gordon
 James
 Percy
 Toby
 Duck
 Donald and Douglas
 Oliver
 Bill and Ben
 Diesel
 Mavis
 'Arry and Bert
 Salty
 Harvey
 Skarloey
 Rheneas
 Peter Sam
 Rusty
 Duncan
 Annie and Clarabel
 Troublesome Trucks
 Toad
 Bertie
 Harold
 Bulgy
 Cranky
 Elizabeth
 The Fat Controller
 Lady Hatt
 Stephen Hatt
 Bridget Hatt
 The Refreshment Lady
 Terence (does not speak)
 Trevor (does not speak)
 Jem Cole (does not speak)
 The Vicar of Wellsworth (does not speak)
 Farmer Trotter (not named; does not speak)
 Stepney (stock footage appearance, does not speak)
 Henrietta (cameo)
 George (cameo)
 Butch (cameo)
 Tiger Moth (cameo)
 Mrs. Kyndley (cameo)
 Nancy (cameo)
 Tom Tipper (cameo)
 Cyril (cameo)
 Jenny Packard (cameo)
 Farmer McColl (cameo)
 Duke (stock footage cameo)

Home Video Releases
Series 7 was released on VHS and DVD in the UK by Video Collection International in three volumes.

The three episodes not included in the separate volumes are "What's the Matter with Henry?", "Rheneas and the Roller Coaster", and "Not So Hasty Puddings". The entirety of Series 7 was released on DVD in January 2008, and various episodes from the series have also appeared on other DVD releases.

Notes

References

Notes

Thomas & Friends seasons
2003 British television seasons